Pete Sampras defeated Ivan Lendl in the final, 6–3, 3–6, 6–3 to win the singles tennis title at the 1992 Cincinnati Masters.

Guy Forget was the defending champion, but lost to Todd Woodbridge in the second round.

Seeds
The top eight seeds received a bye to the second round.

Draw

Finals

Top half

Section 1

Section 2

Bottom half

Section 3

Section 4

References

Main Draw

Singles